Bebearia micans, the shimmering forester, is a butterfly in the family Nymphalidae. It is found in Nigeria, Cameroon, Gabon, the Republic of the Congo, the Central African Republic and the Democratic Republic of the Congo.

The larvae feed on Haumannia danckelmanniana.

References

Butterflies described in 1899
micans
Butterflies of Africa
Taxa named by Per Olof Christopher Aurivillius